Willie J. Williams  (born September 27, 1951) is a retired lieutenant general in the United States Marine Corps who served as Chief of the Marine Corps Staff. A native of Alabama, he graduated from Stillman College in 1974 and retired in 2013.

References

1951 births
Living people
United States Marine Corps generals